Butch Pressley (born March 12, 1941) is a former Canadian football player who played for the Edmonton Eskimos and Toronto Argonauts. He played college football at the Texas A&M University–Kingsville.

References

1941 births
Living people
Players of American football from Texas
American football running backs
Canadian football running backs
American players of Canadian football
Texas A&M–Kingsville Javelinas football players
Edmonton Elks players
Winnipeg Blue Bombers players
People from San Patricio County, Texas